The Battle for the Kapelsche Veer, also known as Operation Elephant took place between 26–31 January 1945. It was fought between the German Wehrmacht and allied troops at the Kapelsche Veer – a ferry crossing of the River Meuse near the village of Capelle in the province North Brabant of the Netherlands. The Wehrmacht had occupied the Netherlands since May 1940, having conquered the country during the Battle of France. As a result of the battle, both countries had casualties of over 1,000 men (dead, missing, wounded, or in war captivity).

Commander of the First British Corps, General John Crocker, intended for this German bridgehead to be overwhelmed at any cost. The last part of the battle was "Operation Elephant", the code-name of an Allied operation against paratroopers holding a ferry crossing on the Maas river at Kapelsche Veer. Allied regiments in Operation Elephant were the Lincoln and the Welland Regiment, the Argyll and Sutherland Highlanders of Canada, and the South Alberta Regiment tanks (elements of the Fourth Canadian Armored Division). The small ferry slip was defended heavily and the allies suffered 300 casualties before winning. 

The 'Official Summary of the Canadian Army' writes (p. 244f.):

References

Sources 
 The Battle of the Scheldt and the Winter on the Maas - Official Summary of the Canadian Army
 Article about a Canadian Soldier who took part in that battle
 bbs.keyhole.com
 canadiansoldiers.com article
 www.canada.ca

Kapelsche Veer
Kapelsche Veer
Conflicts in 1945